James Stewart Carrick (4 September 1855 – 2 January 1923) was a Scottish rugby union and cricket player. He died in Seattle, Washington in 1923.

He was clearly a highly accomplished player, the only batsman to take a century off Nottinghamshire CCC between 1887 and 1890 when they dominated county cricket.

Rugby Union career

Amateur career

Carrick played with Glasgow Academicals.

Provincial career

He also played at provincial level representing Glasgow District.

He also represented the West of Scotland District.

He was selected for the Whites Trial side in 1878.

International career

Carrick was capped for the Scotland international squad between 1876 and 1877.

Referee career

Carrick later became a rugby union referee. He refereed the East of Scotland District versus West of Scotland District match in 1886.

He refereed the Glasgow District versus Edinburgh District match in 1887.

Administrative career

Carrick became the 15th President of the Scottish Rugby Union. He served the 1886–87 term in office.

Cricket career

A notable cricketer who took the record for the world's highest score at the age of 29, Carrick scored 419 not out for the touring West of Scotland team against Priory Park in Chichester in July 1885.  A left-handed batsman, he batted for 11 and a half hours and the second day's play was extended by a few minutes to allow him to beat William Roe's 415.

Carrick opened the innings and batted for the entire two-day match, making his score out of 745/4. He scored one eight (a huge hit to square leg), two sixes, two fives and 30 fours. The Priory Park bowling was headed by James Lillywhite, a bowler with over 1,200 first-class wickets, including eight in his two Tests, but who was caned for 170 here.  Carrick's innings featured strong off-driving and hefty blows to leg and was blemished by only two chances, to deep-mid-on and the keeper. Priory Park put the chance to become part of history above any resentment over the lack of a declaration and, the record achieved, Carrick was "carried to the dressing room amid immense cheering".

His brother, John Carrick, played cricket at first-class level.

See also
 List of Scottish cricket and rugby union players

References

Sources

 Bath, Richard (ed.) The Scotland Rugby Miscellany (Vision Sports Publishing Ltd, 2007 )

External links
Cricinfo Article
In depth Article

1855 births
1923 deaths
Scotland international rugby union players
Scottish cricketers
Scottish rugby union players
Glasgow Academicals rugby union players
Cricketers from Glasgow
Rugby union players from Glasgow
Glasgow District (rugby union) players
Scottish rugby union referees
Scottish Districts referees
West of Scotland District (rugby union) players
Whites Trial players
Presidents of the Scottish Rugby Union